Charles "Chuck" Strand is an American theater composer and lyricist. Strand, along with Gene Curty and Nitra Scharfman, wrote the music, book and lyrics to the Tony Award and Drama Desk Award nominated rock opera The Lieutenant. He also arranged the music and was the musical director for the show.

Strand also wrote the music and lyrics to the Off-Off-Broadway show A Naughty Knight which was produced at The Duke Theatre on 42nd Street in New York and performed by the Jewish Repertory Theatre in 2001.

References

External links 

American lyricists
20th-century American dramatists and playwrights
Living people
Year of birth missing (living people)
Place of birth missing (living people)
21st-century American dramatists and playwrights
American male dramatists and playwrights
20th-century American male writers
21st-century American male writers